Irina Dorneanu (born 3 March 1990 in Suceava) is a Romanian rower. She finished 4th in the eight at the 2012 Summer Olympics.

She was also part of the Romanian women's eights who won the European championships in 2011, 2012, 2013 and 2014, and won bronze in 2015.

References

External links
 
 
 
 

1990 births
Living people
Romanian female rowers
Rowers at the 2012 Summer Olympics
Olympic rowers of Romania
European Rowing Championships medalists
Sportspeople from Suceava